The Scottish Dental Practice Board was created on 1 April 1989. It was previously called the Scottish Dental Estimates Board.

It is statutorily responsible for the fees (but not allowances) authorised to dentists by Practitioner Services.

A computerised payments system is operated for the board by NHS National Services Scotland. It also undertakes random and targeted examinations of patients through the Scottish Dental Reference Service.

References

NHS Scotland
Dentistry in Scotland
1989 establishments in Scotland
Organizations established in 1989